Loyalton is an unincorporated community in Edmunds County, in the U.S. state of South Dakota. Other than a couple of farms, there are no businesses or services located there, and less than half a dozen homes.

History
A post office at Loyalton was established in 1886, and remained in operation until 1974. A large share of the first settlers being Union Army war veterans most likely caused the name to be selected.

References

Unincorporated communities in Edmunds County, South Dakota
Unincorporated communities in South Dakota